William Graham Hoover is an American computational physicist.

He is best known for creating the Nose–Hoover method in molecular dynamics. His six books can be found on the Amazon website and copies of 267 of his research publications are available on his personal website.

Selected publications

References

External links
Personal website

21st-century American physicists
Year of birth missing (living people)
Living people
Computational physicists
Fellows of the American Physical Society